Anna Yesipova (born 27 January 1997 in Odesa, Ukraine) is a Ukrainian synchronised swimmer. She won two bronze medals at the inaugural European Games where she was third in team and combination competitions.

References

1997 births
Living people
Ukrainian synchronized swimmers
European Games medalists in synchronised swimming
European Games bronze medalists for Ukraine
Synchronised swimmers at the 2015 European Games
Sportspeople from Odesa
21st-century Ukrainian women